Anton Salman is a Palestinian politician and the mayor of Bethlehem.

He was elected to the post in 2017, taking over from Vera Baboun.  His "All for Bethlehem" list won 8 out of the 15 seats. He is a lawyer by profession, and a Christian.

References

1964 births
Living people
Mayors of Bethlehem
20th-century Palestinian lawyers
Palestinian Christians
21st-century Palestinian lawyers